Unsettled is a 2007 documentary about Israelis in the Gaza strip. Unsettled may also refer to:

 "Unsettled", a song from the 1988 Robyn Hitchcock album Globe of Frogs
 Unsettled, a 2004 poetry collection by Zachariah Wells
 Uninhabited regions

See also
Unsettled Land, a 1987 Israeli drama directed by Uri Barbas
 Settlement (disambiguation)